Carl Rubin (24 June 1899 – 7 February 1955) was an Israeli architect known for his work in the international style. He designed many of the iconic buildings in this style in Tel Aviv.

Biography
Carl Rubin was born in 1899 in Sniatyn in Galicia. He studied architecture in Vienna. In 1920, Rubin immigrated to Eretz Israel, settling in Tel Aviv. In 1931, Rubin returned to Berlin to work for Erich Mendelsohn, an Allenstein-born Jewish architect whose architectural philosophy influenced Rubin's later designs.

In 1932, Rubin moved back to Tel Aviv in Mandate Palestine and opened his own architectural office, contributing to the development of Tel Aviv and UNESCO's later recognition of the "White City" as a World Heritage Site.

Projects

Dizengoff House/Independence Hall

One of Rubin's important designs was his remodelling of the building that became Israel's Independence Hall (at Rothschild Boulevard 16). In 1932, Rubin resigned the home of Mayor of Tel Aviv Me'ir Dizengoff, who donated it to the city as the first home of the Tel Aviv Museum of Art.

Dr. Sadovsky House
Rubin designed numerous residential complexes in Tel Aviv. One of these buildings, the home of Dr. Sadovsky (85, Rothschild Boulevard), designed in 1933, sold for 7 million dollars in 2007.

Citrus House/Beit Hadar
In 1935–1936, Rubin designed the Beit Hadar office building aka Citrus House, the first in Tel Aviv with a steel frame structure.

References

Architects in Mandatory Palestine
Israeli architects
1899 births
1955 deaths